Eileen Appelbaum (born June 13, 1940) is an American economist. She is the co-director of the Center for Economic and Policy Research and an expert in private equity and labor relations. Her most recent book, Private Equity at Work: When Wall Street Manages Main Street, which she co-authored with Rosemary Batt, was a finalist for the Academy of Management's George R. Terry Book Award in 2016. She also co-wrote, with Ruth Milkman, Unfinished Business: Paid Family Leave in California and the Future of U.S. Work-Family Policy, published by Cornell University Press in 2013.

Education
Appelbaum holds a PhD in economics from the University of Pennsylvania.

References

External links
 CEPR homepage

1940 births
21st-century American economists
21st-century American women
American women economists
Economists from Illinois
Living people
People from Chicago